John Alan South (30 November 1952 – 21 December 2004) was an English footballer who played as a midfielder in the Football League for Colchester United. He died in Spain in 2004 at the age of 52, after living there for two years with his wife, Georgina, and their young son George.

Career

Born in Bow, London, South began his career at Leyton Orient but failed to break into the first team, joining Dick Graham at Colchester United on a three-month trial. He made his debut on 26 August 1972 in a 3–1 defeat to Newport County at Layer Road. He made just four league appearances for Colchester during which Graham resigned. He played his final professional game in a 3–2 home defeat to Aldershot on 9 October before injuring his cartilage that forced him to retire from professional football. However, once recovered from the injury, South returned to football by joining non-league side Molins.

References

1952 births
2004 deaths
Footballers from Bow, London
English footballers
Association football defenders
Leyton Orient F.C. players
Colchester United F.C. players
English Football League players